Harry Frank Ernest Bamford MBE (8 April 1914 – 4 June 1949) was an English professional footballer who played in the Football League for Brighton & Hove Albion as a left back or outside left.

Personal life 
Bamford served as a squadron sergeant major in the Royal Army Service Corps in Italy during the Second World War and was twice mentioned in dispatches. He was later awarded an MBE.

Career statistics

References

1914 births
Military personnel from Surrey
English footballers
English Football League players
Brentford F.C. players
Aldershot F.C. wartime guest players
1949 deaths
Footballers from Kingston upon Thames
Association football fullbacks
Association football outside forwards
Hayes F.C. players
Brighton & Hove Albion F.C. players
Members of the Order of the British Empire
British Army personnel of World War II

Southern Football League players
Colchester United F.C. players
Royal Army Service Corps soldiers